MFSA may refer to:

Business and finance 
 Malta Financial Services Authority, a Maltese financial regulator
 Manitoba Forage Seed Association, a Canadian nonprofit organization

Education 
 Masters Student Finance Association, a finance student organization

Religion 
 Methodist Federation for Social Action, an independent network of United Methodist clergy and laity